Eat Hot Tofu Slowly is a 2005 Chinese comedy film directed by Feng Gong and written by Feng and Cui Yanjun.  The film follows the emotional relationships of a middle-aged working-class man played by Feng Gong.  It is set in Baoding of the Hebei province, with dialogue in the Baoding dialect.

Cast
 Feng Gong as Liu Hao
 Xu Fan as Yang Qian
 Ding Dang as Liu Xiaohao
 Liu Mei as Chen Hong
 Zhang Shu as He Wenlan
 Shen Junyi as Yao Yuan
 Liu Jiang as Grandpa Li
 Ding Jiali as Aunt 
 Guo Da as the director of a hospital
 Guo Donglin as Zhang Qiang
 Li Qi as the guard
 Juhao as Doctor

Accolades

External links 
 
 Eat Hot Tofu Slowly at the Chinese Movie Database

2005 films
2000s Mandarin-language films
Films set in Hebei
2005 comedy films
Chinese comedy films